Calosoma abyssinicum is a species of ground beetle in the subfamily of Carabinae. It was described by Gestro in 1880.

References

abyssinicum
Beetles described in 1880